Robert Swann (1945–2006) was a British actor with a film career spanning thirty five years. He was also active on stage, including appearances with the National Theatre and in the West End. He is best known to American audiences through his portrayal of a Church of England vicar in the television series The Witches and the Grinnygog. He played Colonel Brandon in the 1981 Jane Austen BBC TV series Sense and Sensibility. An early film role was the sadistic house prefect of Malcolm McDowell in the 1968 film if..... His last credited acting role was in the series Wire in the Blood in 2004. He died two years later in 2006.

Filmography

References

External links

British male actors
1945 births
2006 deaths